The Men's 81 kg judo competitions at the 2022 Commonwealth Games in Birmingham, England took place on August 2nd at the Coventry Arena. A total of 16 competitors from 16 nations took part.

Results
The draw is as follows:

Repechages

References

External link
 
 Results
 

M81
2022